Nemanja Đurić (June 18, 1936), is a Serbian former professional basketball player and former coach. He represented the Yugoslavia national basketball team internationally.

Early life 
Đurić was raised in a sports family. His father and uncle played football for Slavija in Belgrade. He has trained many sports, played football for Šumadija Belgrade, after which he moved to handball club Hero, and later moved to volleyball club Partizan where he stays for a longer period and played for all youth selections. Đurić started to play basketball at the urging of his friend Slobodan Ivković.

Playing career 
Đurić made his first basketball steps in Crvena zvezda when he was 19. The club felt that he was too old, so he went to Radnički Belgrade.

Đurić played in Italy for Noalex Venezia in 1967–68 season. After that he return to Crvena zvezda and won Yugoslav League in 1968–69 season along with Vladimir Cvetković, Zoran Slavnić, Dragan Kapičić, Ljubodrag Simonović and others. Also, he played in 1969–70 European Champions Cup. Later, he played for Oriolik from Slavonski Brod.

National team career
As a player for the Yugoslavia national basketball team Đurić has played from 1959 to 1967. He participated in two FIBA World Championships (1963 in Brazil and 1967 in Uruguay) and four European Championships (1959 in Turkey, 1961 in Yugoslavia, 1963 in Poland and 1965 in Soviet Union) and two Summer Olympics (1960 in Rome and 1964 in Tokyo). Đurić won two silver medals at World Championships, two silver medals in 1961 and 1965) and one bronze (1963) at European Championships. He won a gold medal at 1959 Mediterranean Games in Lebanon.

During late May and early June 1964, Đurić faced off against a team of NBA All-Stars at three of their four games in Yugoslavia — on 29 May and 30 May 1964 in Belgrade as well as 2 June 1964 in Karlovac. In Karlovac, the team consisting of local players lost 65–110. US players coached by Red Auerbach were Bob Cousy, Tom Heinsohn, K. C. Jones, Jerry Lucas, Bob Pettit, Oscar Robertson and Bill Russel. Alongside Đurić, the players on the local team were Giuseppe Gjergja, Mirko Novosel, Petar Skansi and others.

Coaching career 
Đurić was an assistant coach of the Crvena zvezda roster that won the 1974 European Cup Winners' Cup, assisting to Aleksandar Nikolić.

Đurić was the head coach of Crvena zvezda for two seasons between 1974 and 1976, winning one Yugoslav Cup in 1975.

Career achievements 
As player
 Yugoslav League champion: 1 (with Crvena zvezda: 1968–69).

As head coach
 Yugoslav Cup winner: 1 (with Crvena zvezda: 1974–75).

As assistant coach
 European Cup Winners' Cup winner: 1 (with Crvena zvezda: 1973–74).

Coaching record 
Yugoslav Basketball League

|- 
| align="left"|Crvena zvezda
| align="left"|1974–75
| 26 || 18 || 8 ||  || 4th
|- 
| align="left"|Crvena zvezda
| align="left"|1975–76
| 26 || 13 || 13 ||  || 5th
|-class="sortbottom"
| align="center" colspan=2|Career||52||31||21||||

See also 
 List of Red Star Belgrade basketball coaches
 Yugoslavia at the 1959 Mediterranean Games

References

External links
 

1936 births
Living people
Basketball players from Belgrade
Serbian expatriate basketball people in Italy
Serbian expatriate basketball people in Croatia
Yugoslav men's basketball players
1963 FIBA World Championship players
1967 FIBA World Championship players
Yugoslav basketball coaches
Serbian men's basketball players
Serbian men's basketball coaches
KK Crvena zvezda assistant coaches
KK Crvena zvezda head coaches
KK Crvena zvezda youth coaches
KK Crvena zvezda players
Power forwards (basketball)
BKK Radnički players
Basketball players at the 1960 Summer Olympics
Basketball players at the 1964 Summer Olympics
Competitors at the 1959 Mediterranean Games
Mediterranean Games gold medalists for Yugoslavia
Mediterranean Games medalists in basketball
Olympic basketball players of Yugoslavia